Bob Morane is an animated series, based on the fictional French superspy Bob Morane. Claude Landry was a scriptwriter for the show.

Cast
Emmanuel Jacomy as Bob Morane
Marc Alfos as Bill Ballantine
Frédérique Tirmont as Sophia Paramount
Yves Barsacq as Professeur Clérembart
Patrick Osmond as Professeur Xhatan
Francis Lax as Simon Lusse
Hervé Bellon as Staggart

Episode list

References

External links
 
 BOB MORANE ENGLISH OFFICIAL at YouTube

1998 French television series debuts
1998 French television series endings
1990s French animated television series
1990s Canadian animated television series
1990s Canadian science fiction television series
Canadian children's animated adventure television series
Canadian children's animated science fiction television series
French children's animated adventure television series
French children's animated science fiction television series
Espionage television series
Television shows based on comics
Television shows based on French novels
Canal+ original programming
Bob Morane